The Fiat A.54 was a seven-cylinder, air-cooled radial engine developed in Italy in the 1930s as a powerplant for aircraft. Amongst others, it powered the Ambrosini SAI.1 and SAI.2 racing aircraft.

Applications
Ambrosini SAI.1
Ambrosini SAI.2
Caproni Ca.100
Fiat G.2/4
Jona J-6
Nuvoli N.5Cab

Specifications

See also

References

 oldengine.org 

Radial engines
A.54
1930s aircraft piston engines